Helga Zöllner (11 May 1941 — 10 September 1983) was a Hungarian figure skater. She was a two-time (1960, 1962) Winter Universiade bronze medalist and a six-time (1957–62) Hungarian national champion. She placed 13th at the 1962 European Championships in Geneva and 19th at the 1962 World Championships in Prague.

Competitive highlights

References 

1941 births
1983 deaths
Hungarian female single skaters
Figure skaters from Budapest
Universiade medalists in figure skating
Universiade bronze medalists for Hungary
Competitors at the 1960 Winter Universiade
Competitors at the 1962 Winter Universiade